Vellithuruthi Thazhathu Karutha Patteri Raman Bhattathiripad (1896–1982), also known as V. T. Bhattathiripad, was an Indian social reformer, dramatist and an Indian independence activist. He was best known for his contributions in the reformation of the casteism and conservatism that existed in the Namboothiri community. He wrote a number of books which include a play, Adukkalayail Ninnu Arangathekku and his autobiography, Kanneerum Kinavum  (Tears and Dreams in English) and many critics consider them as notable works in Malayalam literature. Kerala Sahitya Akademi honoured him with distinguished fellowship in 1976.

Biography 

V. T. Bhattathiripad, born Raman Bhattathiripad, was born on 26 March 1896 to Thuppan Bhattathiripad and Sridevi Andarjanam in Kaippilly Mana at Mezhathur, Ponnani taluk Malabar District, Madras Presidency, British India
, on the bank of River Ponnani. He belonged to the family of Mezhathol Agnihothri on his father's side and had the lineage of Adi Sankara on his mother's side. After early education in the traditional way under Narayanan Othikkan, he studied under Pathakkara Manaikkal Meledam and Muthukurissi Mana Kunjunni Namboothirippad and on completion of vedic studies, he started working as a priest at shornur Mundamuka Sastha temple, owned by Kudalloor Mana. A ten-year-old girl from the neighbourhood taught him Malayalam alphabets and mathematics. He would study English soon after by joining Edakkuni Namboodiri School during which time he also ran a magazine by name, Vidyarthi.

Indian independence movement was gaining popularity and Bhattathiripad participated in the Allahabad session of the Indian National Congress due to which he was expelled from his community. This prompted him to fight against casteism and he started campaigning for Brahmin widow remarriage and for raising funds for the campaign, he organized a march from Thrissur to Chandragiri River in 1931 which came to be known as Yachana Yathra (Begging March).

The first marriage of Bhattathiripad did not last long and later he married Sreedevi Antharjanam of Ittyaparambath Illam. He died on 12 February 1982, at the age of 85.

Legacy 
 
Bhattathiripad sought the emancipation of Namboothiri women, and encouraged widow marriages which was a taboo during those times. Along with M. R. Bhattathiripad, popularly known as MRB, he campaigned for widow remarriage by putting it in practice in his own household; he gave his sister in law. a widow, in marriage to MRB which was the first widow remarriage among Namboothiris in Kerala. Another widow marriage also followed soon which was the marriage of M. P. Bhattathiripad, better known as Premji, who was MRB's younger brother, to Arya, a 27 year old Namboothiri widow and Bhattathiripad, along with E. M. S. Namboothiripad, as well as the couple were excommunicated (Brashtu) by the community leaders.

Bhattathiripad utilised his writing skills as a tool for social reforms and his writings contrasted the social changes that followed the Indian independence movement against the dormant state of Namboothiri community. The staging of his play, Adukkalayilninnu Arangathekku (From the Kitchen to the Stage), which featured Premji as one of the actors, in 1929 at Edakkunni, a village in Thrissur, was an important event in the social reform calendar of Kerala; the play highlighted the discriminatory rituals and practices prevalent in the Namboothiri community, especially the plight of Namboothiti women. The drama also marked a deviation in Malayalam theatre from historical plays to social dramas.

Bhattathiripad's oeuvre consists of a play, a short story anthology, eleven essay compilations and three memoirs, of which Kanneerum Kinavum, the first of his three memoirs, narrates his life from 1896 until 1916 and is a documentation of the Namboothiri rituals and feudalism. The book was later translated into English by Sindhu V. Nair under the title, My Tears, My Dreams and was published by Oxford University Press.

Honours 
Kerala Sahitya Akademi honoured him with distinguished fellowship in 1976. The Sreekrishnapuram VT Bhattathiripad College in Sreekrishnapuram, Palakkad district, is named after him.

Bibliography

Play

Short story anthology

Essays

Memoirs

Translations

Writings on V. T. Bhattathiripad

See also

 Kerala reformation movement
 Hindu reform movements
 Caste system in Kerala
 List of Malayalam-language authors
 Ayyathan Gopalan

See Also (Social reformers of Kerala) 

 Sree Narayana Guru
 Dr. Palpu
 Kumaranasan
 Rao Sahib Dr. Ayyathan Gopalan
 Brahmananda Swami Sivayogi
 Vaghbhatananda
 Mithavaadi Krishnan
 Moorkoth Kumaran
 Ayyankali
 Ayya Vaikundar
 Pandit Karuppan

Notes

References

External links
 
 
 

1896 births
1982 deaths
Malayali people
Dramatists and playwrights from Kerala
Indian social reformers
Malayalam-language writers
Anti-Brahminism
Indian male dramatists and playwrights
Indian Hindus
20th-century Indian dramatists and playwrights
20th-century Indian male writers
Recipients of the Kerala Sahitya Akademi Award